The first season of Tangled: The Series, renamed Rapunzel's Tangled Adventure following the season, premiered on March 24, 2017 and concluded on January 13, 2018. It begins nearly a week after the movie premiere Before Ever After.

Episodes

Soundtrack

Tangled: The Series (Music from the TV Series) is the second soundtrack album from the Tangled franchise. It was released on January 19, 2018, by Walt Disney Records.

Track listing

References

Tangled (franchise)
2017 American television seasons
2018 American television seasons
2017 EPs
2018 soundtrack albums
Walt Disney Records soundtracks